KQPS-LD, virtual and UHF digital channel 14, was a low-powered Telemundo-affiliated television station licensed to Hot Springs, Arkansas, and serving the Little Rock area of central Arkansas. The station is owned by the DTV America Corporation.

History 
This station's construction permit was granted in October 2012, under a translator-style callsign, K14PS-D. Even after the callsign was changed to the current KQPS-LD on March 11, 2013, the station was still silent. The station operated as a Telemundo affiliate from its December 17, 2014 sign-on until it ceased operations in 2021.

In 2017, the station was purchased by HC2 Holdings (now Innovate Corp.). 

The station's license was cancelled on June 1, 2021. The Telemundo affiliation in Little Rock is now presently held by KKYK-CD.

Digital channels
The station's digital signal was multiplexed:

References

External links

DTV America - Corporate Website
KQPS-LD: Telemundo

Laff (TV network) affiliates
Ion Mystery affiliates
QPS-LD
Television channels and stations established in 2013
Low-power television stations in the United States
2013 establishments in Arkansas
Innovate Corp.